The friggitoria ("fryer" in Italian, plural friggitorie) is a shop that sells fried foods. They are found throughout Italy.

Friggitorie are common in Naples, especially in the historic center, where you can buy fried foods including pastacresciute (savory zeppole), scagliozzi (fried polenta) and sciurilli (fried zucchini blossoms), fried eggplant and Crocchè (potato fritters).

Outside of Naples, the friggitorie are also widespread in other areas. In Liguria, these shops were formerly common in the Sottoripa area in front of the port of Genoa, though a few still remain and in Palermo, where friggatore, sometimes street vendors, prepare dishes like panelle.

Foods commonly sold at friggatorie 
 Arancini
 Calzone
 Crocchè
 Panelle
 Panissa
 Pizza fritta

References

Cuisine of Sicily
Neapolitan cuisine
Street food in Italy